Gwinn is a surname. Notable people with the surname include:

Curtis Gwinn, writer
Donald Gwinn (1902–1961), American hammer thrower
John Gwinn III (1791–1849), United States Navy officer
Giulia Gwinn, German footballer
Lambert Estes Gwinn (1884–1958), Tennessee attorney, educator, and politician
Peter Gwinn, American comedy writer and improviser
Ralph W. Gwinn (1884–1962), Republican member of US House of Representatives from NY

See also
Gwinn, Michigan, unincorporated community in Marquette County, Michigan, United States